is a railway station in Yamaguchi, Yamaguchi Prefecture, Japan.

Lines 
West Japan Railway Company
Yamaguchi Line

Adjacent stations 

Railway stations in Yamaguchi Prefecture
Railway stations in Japan opened in 1962